The Anglican Church of St Mary Magdalene in Barwick, Somerset, England was built in the 13th century. It is a Grade II* listed building.

History

The church was built in the 13th century. During a Victorian restoration in 1885 the chancel was rebuilt.

Because of the condition of the roofs of the nave, chancel and tower the church has been placed on the Heritage at Risk Register.

The parish is part of the benefice of Yeovil Holy Trinity with Barwick within the Diocese of Bath and Wells.

Architecture

The hamstone building has clay tile roofs. It consists of a three-bay nave and two-bay chancel. The two-stage tower is unbuttressed.

Inside the church is a 14th-century piscina and a pulpit from 1619. The cylindrical fluted hamstone font is lead lined and decorated with cable moulding.

References

Grade II* listed buildings in South Somerset
Grade II* listed churches in Somerset
Church of England church buildings in South Somerset